Tikan (also Romanized as Tīkan and Tīken) is a village in Nivan Rural District, in the Central District of Golpayegan County, Isfahan Province, Iran. At the 2006 census, its population was 403, in 126 families.

References 

Populated places in Golpayegan County